Henry Marshall or Marshal may refer to:

Politics
Henry Augustus Marshall (1770s–1841), British colonial administrator in British Ceylon
Henry Marshall (Louisiana politician) (1805–1864), American Confederate politician
Henry Marshall (New York politician) (1847–1938), American lawyer and politician from New York
Henry W. Marshall (1865–1951), publisher and politician in Indiana
Henry Marshall (MP) (1688–1754), British merchant and politician

Religion
Henry Marshal (bishop of Exeter) (1150–1206), medieval Catholic bishop in England
Henry Marshall (bishop of Salford) (1884–1955), modern Roman Catholic bishop in England

Sports
Henry Marshall (American football) (born 1954), American football player
Henry Marshall (footballer) (1872–1936), Scottish footballer (Celtic FC and Scotland)
Henry Marshall (cricketer) (1831–1914), English cricketer
Henry Marshal (cricketer) (1900–1970), cricketer for Argentina

Other
Henry Marshall (physician) (1775–1851), medical pioneer
Henry Rutgers Marshall (1852–1927), American architect and psychologist

See also
Harry Marshall (disambiguation)